is a Japanese professional footballer who plays as a midfielder for Cambodian League club Preah Khan Reach Svay Rieng. He previously played in the Philippines for JPV Marikina, Davao Aguilas, and United City (formerly Ceres–Negros).

He was signed in by Ceres–Negros in 2019, and helped the club win the 2019 league and cup titles. He made his AFC Champions League debut in the playoff against Burmese side Shan United.

Odawara won the 2019 Copa Paulino Alcantara Golden Ball for his defensive performance.

References

1992 births
Living people
Japanese footballers
Japanese expatriate footballers
Association football midfielders
JPV Marikina F.C. players
Davao Aguilas F.C. players
Ceres–Negros F.C. players
Japanese expatriate sportspeople in the Philippines
Expatriate footballers in the Philippines
Expatriate footballers in Cambodia
Japanese expatriate sportspeople in Cambodia